Janis Ian is the debut album by American singer-songwriter Janis Ian, released in January 1967.

Background
Janis Eddy Fink had begun writing poetry when she was eight and singing when she was twelve. Changing her name to "Janis Ian" after the middle name of her brother, she began to perform in New York folk clubs in her teens and made her first recording, "Baby I've Been Thinking" in September 1965. The song's topic of interracial romance was highly controversial and many record labels rejected Ian's recording.

Ian signed with Verve Records in 1966 and released the single – retitled as "Society’s Child" – in September 1966. It slowly caught on and peaked at number 14 in the United States in July 1967. Her self-titled debut album was released at the beginning of 1967, peaking at number 29 at the beginning of September that year. Contemporary reviewers, notably Loraine Alterman of the Detroit Free Press, generally praised Ian's lyrical talent but some such as Peter Johnson of the Los Angeles Times said that the record's lyrical strengths were countered by Ian's fundamental musical weaknesses such as a thin voice.

During her period of prominence in the middle 1970s Janis Ian would distance herself from her Verve albums, calling them “a tax write-off for Verve” She would drop even “Society’s Child” from her setlists whilst signed to Columbia Records, and although “Society’s Child” has returned since her 1990s comeback, nothing else from the debut is known to have been performed since 1972.

Track listing

Personnel
Janis Ian - guitar, organ, harpsichord, siren, tambourine, vocals, arrangements
Al Gorgoni, Sal DiTroia, Vinnie Bell - guitar
Joe Mack - bass
Artie Butler - harpsichord, piano, organ
Buddy Saltzman - drums
Artie Kaplan - flute, arrangements
Technical
Jerry Schoenbaum - production supervisor
Val Valentin - director of engineering
Joseph Solman - cover artwork

References

Albums produced by Shadow Morton
Janis Ian albums
1967 debut albums
Verve Records albums